Francesco Ferdinando Alfieri was a master of fencing of the 17th century. He was a representative of the Venetian school of fencing and “Maestro D’Arme” to the Accademia Delia in Padua in 1640. Alfieri was originally from Padua,  which at that time was considered territory of the Venetian Republic.

Most of the Venetian and Italian fencing masters in their treatises describe the famous fencing master Francesco Alfieri as an 'unsurpassed master of fencing', and documents from outside of Italy also contain references to him. Blasco Florio says, in his treatise "The Science of Fencing with the sword of Blasco Florio" (La scienza della scherma esposta da Blasco Florio):

Works

Several treatises by Alfieri are known:

 La Bandiera ("The Ensign" or "Flag"), published in 1638, which treats flag drill
 La Scherma ("Fencing"), published in 1640 and reprinted in 1645, which treats rapier fencing
 La Picca ("The Pike"), published in 1641, which treats pike drill and also appends the entirety of his treatise on flag drill
 L’arte di ben maneggiare la spada ("The Art of Handling the Sword Well"), published in 1653 and reprinted in 1683, which includes the entirety of his treatise on rapier fencing and appends a section on the use of the Spadone (two-handed sword).
 "The Art of Excellent Possession of the Sword", includes his entire treatise on fencing with ar apier and added a section on the use of Spadone (a two-handed sword).

The ancient treatise Francesco Alfieri 1653 edition of the "L'arte di ben maneggiare la spada" - from the Italian language was translated by scientists and masters of fencing into Russian. The book was published under the title "The Art of Excellent Possession of the Sword". The translation was made by the Research Institute "World Traditions of Martial Arts and Criminal Investigations of the Use of Weapons" in cooperation with the School of Spanish Fencing "Destreza Achinech"

The Art of Excellent Swordplay 

Alfieri's treatise "The Art of Excellent Sword Ownership" aroused great admiration among the masters of fencing and respect, as it became one of the most popular fencing books. Even in the modern world of fencing this treatise is considered to be one of the field of fencing's  best textbooks.

One of the disciples described in this way the treatise of his great teacher:

The treatise "The Art of Excellent Sword Hold" reflects Francesco Alfieri's thought and opinion on fencing, the author described the complete basic set of ways and methods, the advantages that a person can gain in combat and in everyday life from studying the Art of Arms. Alfieri, one of not many authors, described how the art of fencing can be made useful and how to become the best master in this matter. This treatise has come down to our days and conveyed all of its wisdom and practice of using weapons. The treatise is written - in the language of the heart, as the followers of Alfieri say, in which the causes and principles of fencing grow, respectively, in the application of which fear and insecurity in combat disappear.

Alfieri is considered an unsurpassed master of fencing, at that time he gathered all his practice and experience in science and tried to convey this all in his work, brought his new Mixed Martial position.

The mixed combat position is a proportional position and is suitable for moving into the Counterblow position against the First, Second, Third, Fourth combat positions. Also, here you can use a high position form, for example, to reject a blow in the Third position - outward or in the inner part, then you need to take the fourth battle position. Thus, the enemy will not be able to free himself, which is very important for striking. In this situation, it is harmful to perform direct movements, they can be fatal. If you do not want to be stabbed, you can find your way, how to change the shape, and then continue fencing. In this case, it is better to do everything in order to maintain a favourable position without any restrictions, also find other convenient moments, strike with the attack in any closer open part of the opponent's body.

This Mixed martial position allowed Alfieri to end all fights with a victory, so he preferred to use it more often than most others, used for protection and for striking the opponent. In addition, the author examined the main types of weapons that were most used at that time, considered separately the features of their use, principles and true purpose, their observations and conclusions from practice. The weapons in question are: a sword, a dagger, a dropon, a kapa, a targa, a broker, namely in a treatise such topics as:

First part:

Basic principles of fencing.
On the formation of the knight.
On the forms of art.
Methods of determining the shape.
About time in art.
On the combat positions.
About moving the body and steps.
On the features of the first and second combat positions.
About the Third and Fourth Combat Positions and their advantages.
On deviations and their varieties.
About feints.
How can you understand the nature and art of the enemy.
What you need to counteract the shock when the legs are still or in a step.
On the Counterboy Position.
Where you need to be in combat.
Ways to strike and the nature of the blows.
How to deal with shy, reckless, phlegmatic and choleric.
The advantages between strength and weakness.
Advantages between big and small.
The choice between the movement in the fighting position and the waiting.

The second and third parts of the treatise Francesco Alfieri are devoted to a detailed consideration of such topics as:

Formation of combat positions, attack and defense.
Inflicting various blows with a sword, a sword and a dagger, a dropon, etc. in different positions.
Separately examined the types of protective weapons and how to use them.
Controls from the dropdown, as well as the ways and methods of using this weapon in defense and attack, management features.

The treatise contains illustrations with detailed explanations and demonstrations of combat positions and how attacks are struck, attack and defense are carried out.

Features and distinctive features in Italian fencing 
Alfieri's treatise "The art of excellent possession of the sword" laid the foundation of Italian fencing. In his work, he draws attention to such features and distinctive features in Italian fencing:

The attack is equal to the defense. There is no separation between attack and defense, parrying is not carried out separately. There is a work with a straight line. When the enemy strikes, he passes by, and the swordsman at this point in time strikes. This method is used provided the knowledge of the sword device, its separation, the ability to work with a brush and forearm, as well as on the understanding of how to control the sword of the enemy in battle.
Blocking the movement of the opponent's free hand with his sword. This element is absent in other schools of fencing.
Blocking the sword by hand. At that moment in time, when a person strikes, that is, a piercing blow, the movement of the sword is inserted, as an obstacle, put out his hand in the glove, then the sword of the enemy begins to slip and go past. Further, the fencer with the other hand can freely apply the necessary blows. Francesco Alfieri in his work describes the mechanisms of the movement of the body or the ways of setting the enemy in a position where the fencer takes the sword to the opponent, unlike the other. A distinctive feature of this fencing is that this effect is achieved with the help of a straight line, and not at an angle, as in other schools of fencing.
Beat on the rotation. The use of the rotation motions of the column, formed when the body turns, is described quite a lot. The sword is skipped and a blow is struck on the rotation of the body. Also demonstrated how to disarm the enemy.
Strikes under the sword (from under the sword) of the enemy.

Opposing the sword of the dagger. Of course, the dagger is shorter than the sword, so the dagger is parried with an executed attack with a sword. And since the dagger does not reach the body of the opponent, then the sword is struck exactly in the direction where the dagger is.
Parrying on the cross. Simultaneous parry with a dagger and sword.
Simultaneous striking with a dagger and a sword.
Practically there are no cutting and cutting blows.
In the main, punches are applied.
Winding a raincoat on your hand, which is used for protective purposes as a shield, which is typical of the Italian school of fencing.
Use a mixed fighting position with a cloak that is wrapped around the arm, and a sword. A wounded raincoat is set against the sword to protect itself from an enemy attack, and then a fatal wound is inflicted.
Use in defense and attack, throwing a cloak on a sword.

Approach and reputation
Alfieri was the first Italian swordsmanship author to amply quote, reference and comment on earlier masters. For instance, we know he was an ardent admirer of earlier Paduan sword master Salvator Fabris, whom he calls "a man of the greatest name in our profession." On the other hand, he sharply criticises Achille Marozzo and Ridolfo Capoferro and strongly disagrees with some of their positions.

In turn, Alfieri was amply quoted and praised by the late 17th-century Italian swordsmanship master Francesco Antonio Marcelli, giving us an indication that his teaching enjoyed some popularity in the 17th century.

See also
Salvator Fabris
Ridolfo Capo Ferro

References

Bibliography

External links
La Scherma, Part 2. Part 2 of Alfieri's treatise (in Italian), including plates, hosted at The School of the Sword. Site also contains a short biography.
An introduction to the use of the dagger in Italian rapier according to Francesco Alfieri.
Ultramundane level of training methodology. Italian Fencing School.
School of Spanish fencing "Destreza Achinech"

Year of birth missing
Year of death missing
17th-century Venetian people
Historical European martial arts
Italian male fencers
Historical fencing